Personality pathology refers to enduring patterns of cognition, emotion, and behavior that negatively affect a person's adaptation. In psychiatry and clinical psychology, it is characterized by adaptive inflexibility, vicious cycles of maladaptive behavior, and emotional instability under stress. In the United States and elsewhere, personality disorders are diagnosed categorically on Axis II of the Diagnostic and Statistical Manual of Mental Disorders published by the American Psychiatric Association.

See also
Personality disorders
Personality psychology
Psychopathology

References
American Psychiatric Association. (2000). Diagnostic and statistical manual of mental disorders (text revision, 4th ed.). Washington, DC: American Psychiatric Association.
Millon, T. (1981). Disorders of personality. DSM-III: Axis II. New York, NY: John Wiley.
Mischel, W., & Shoda, Y. (1995). A cognitive-affective system theory of personality: Reconceptualizing situations, dispositions, dynamics, and invariance in personality structure. Psychological Review, 102(2), 246-268.
Westen, D. (1995). A clinical-empirical model of personality: Life after the mischelian ice age and the NEO-lithic era. Journal of Personality, 63, 495-524.

Personality disorders